Issa Mudashiru (born June 21, 2003) is an American soccer player who currently plays as a defender for Loudoun United in the USL Championship via the D.C. United academy.

Career statistics

Club

Notes

References

2003 births
Living people
American soccer players
Association football defenders
Loudoun United FC players
People from Bethesda, Maryland
Soccer players from Maryland
USL Championship players